Leslie N. Pollard (born 1956) is a Seventh-day Adventist minister, author, and administrator. Since 2011 he has served as the eleventh president of Oakwood University, the church's sole HBCU.

Background
Leslie Nelson Pollard was born in 1956 in New Orleans, Louisiana. He holds a BA in theology from Oakwood University (1978), a Master of Divinity from Andrews University (1983), a Doctor of Ministry from Claremont School of Theology (1992), a Master of Business from La Sierra University (2005), and a PhD in New Testament Language and Literature from Andrews University Seventh-day Adventist Theological Seminary (2007).

In 1979 Pollard was married to Prudence LaBeach, a human resource specialist, educator, and author. The couple have two adult daughters, Kristin Pollard Kiel, an attorney, and Karin Pollard Smith, a pharmacist, and four grandchildren.

Career
Pollard began his career in 1978 as a Seventh-day Adventist pastor. In nearly two decades of ministry, he led several notable churches, including Kansas Avenue (Riverside, California), Berean (Los Angeles, California), and Oakwood University Church (Huntsville, Alabama), and gained an international reputation as an effective evangelist.

From 1996 to 2011 Pollard was the vice president for diversity at Loma Linda University, the second individual to hold the position. Considered an authority on diversity, in 2000 he published Embracing Diversity: How to Understand and Reach People of All Cultures.

Pollard began his presidency at Oakwood University in January 2011. His tenure is notable for the launch of Oakwood Online University; more than $30 million of construction and renovation, most notably the Peters Media Center; the creation of Oakwood Organic Farms, the largest urban farm in Northern Alabama; the establishment of separate schools within the university; a considerable faculty and staff downsizing; and the placement of Oakwood University as an institution of the North American Division instead of its previous status as a General Conference institution. Pollard is also noted for a strong social media presence and involvement in national politics. In June 2022, the Oakwood University Board of Trustees voted to extend Pollard's term to June 2026.

See also

 General Conference of Seventh-day Adventists
 Historically black colleges and universities

References

External links
 Oakwood University
 North American Division of Seventh-day Adventists
 General Conference of Seventh-day Adventist Church
 Oakwood University president reacts to Biden's student loan forgiveness plan Waay31abc

1956 births
Seventh-day Adventist administrators
American Seventh-day Adventists
Seventh-day Adventist religious workers
American Seventh-day Adventist ministers
Living people
Andrews University alumni
Oakwood University alumni
Date of birth missing (living people)